The Murho Estate was a Chieftaincy and later a Zamindari (estate) of Yadav (Ahir) in erstwhile Bhagalpur district of Bihar (now in Madhepura district).

The name of the estate derives from a Murho village of Madhepura District. Members of the Murho family were very big landlords of the Kosi division.

History
The Murho Zamindari (Estate) was ruled by Majhraut Clan Of Yadava. It was the largest and respected zamindari estate of Kosi region (Bihar).

Rash Bihari Lal Mandal 

Babu Rasbihari Lal was an ardent freedom fighter, philanthropist and social reformer. According to litterateur Dr. Bhupendra Narayan Madhepuri, Rasbihari Babu was scholarly in many languages like Hindi, Urdu, Persian, Bengali, English, French and Sanskrit.

Bindheshwari Prasad Mandal 

Chairman of Mandal Commission and former Chief Minister of Bihar, Babu B.P. Mandal was born in Murho raj family. He was the third son of Zamindar Babu Ras Bihari Lal Mandal.

List of Zamindars
 Babu Sri Panchanan Mandal was the first chieftain of Murho. He had two sons, of whom the eldest son Paraw Mandal became his successor.
 Babu Paraw Mandal, He had five sons named Indrajit Mandal, Miterjit Mandal, Ramdhan Mandal, Gurdayal Mandal and Ramdayal Mandal.
 Babu Ramdayal Mandal became next chief of Zamindari. He had two sons Raghuvardayal and Kishundayal Mandal. 
 Babu Raghuvardayal Mandal became  head of zamindari estate in mid 19th century.
 Babu Rash Bihari lal Mandal (1880-1918), He had three sons, Bhuvneshwari Pd. Mandal, Kamleshwari Pd. Mandal and Bindheshwari Pd. Mandal.
 Babu Bhuvneshwari Prasad Mandal, he took control of zamindari estate after the death of his father Rash Bihari Lal in 1918. He was member of Bihar-Orissa legislative council in 1924.
 Babu Kamleshwari Prasad Mandal, he was member of Bihar legislative council in 1937.
 Babu Bindheshwari Prasad Mandal, Former Chief Minister of Bihar and Chairman of Backward Classes Commission.

Murho Picture Gallery

References

Zamindari estates
Zamindars of Madhepura
Ahir
Bihari Ahirs
History of Bihar